Wesley Coulentianos (born 14 January 1994) is a South African cricketer. He was included in the Easterns cricket team for the 2015 Africa T20 Cup. In April 2021, he was named in Easterns' squad, ahead of the 2021–22 cricket season in South Africa.

References

External links
 

1994 births
Living people
South African cricketers
Easterns cricketers
People from Boksburg
Sportspeople from Gauteng